Braze, Inc. is an American cloud-based software company based in New York City It  is a customer engagement platform used by businesses for multichannel marketing.

Braze provides customer engagement technology for companies such as HBO Max, Skyscanner, PureGym, Burger King, Babylon Health, Grubhub, NASCAR, and CleanChoice Energy.

History 
Braze was co-founded as Appboy in 2011 by Bill Magnuson, Jon Hyman, and Mark Ghermezian. The three met after Magnuson and Hyman won the 2011 NYC Disrupt Hackathon for Gilt-ii. The trio raised $3 million from investors in order to start the company.

In 2016, the company launched Canvas (Cross Channel Journey Management) which allows brands to personalize and automate messages to users as well as incentivizing customers with rewards.  

In August of 2017, the company received $50 million in Series D Financing and later that year, Appboy rebranded to Braze, Inc.

The company launched Braze Alloys in 2018, a network of over 45 integration applications with companies like Segment, and Amplitude. The company also raised $80 million in Series E funding, with a valuation of $850 million, and opened an office in Singapore.

In 2019, Braze added Google AMP for email and passed $100 million in annual recurring revenue. The company was named a leader in Gartner's Magic Quadrant for Mobile Marketing Platforms. Also in 2019, Braze was listed by Inc. as one of the Best Places to Work and Forbes listed Braze on its Cloud 100 list.

In 2020, Braze boycotted Facebook advertising and encouraged other brands to do the same over content moderation practices. The company also joined several other marketing tech firms to offer technology grants to Black founded businesses with the Tech for Black Founders program. At this time, Braze was delivering over 100 billion messages each month and had raised over $175 million in funding. That same year, Inc. listed Braze as one of the Best Workplaces for a second year.

Braze also commissioned the Data Privacy Report providing details about consumers and their privacy concerns. Along with Skyscanner and Apptopia, Braze published the Ready for Takeoff 2021 Travel Industry Trends, Insights and Strategies. Braze introduced integrations with Snowflake and Shopify. Forbes named the company on the Cloud 100 list again. Braze was also recognized as a leader in the Forrester CCCM Wave in 2021. 

In October 2021, Braze filed to go public. On November 17, 2021, Braze’s IPO raised $520 million and had a market valuation of $5.9 billion.

In 2022, Braze released the second annual Global Customer Engagement Review, detailing how retailers approach customer engagement.

References

External links
 

Digital marketing companies of the United States
Software companies established in 2011
American companies established in 2011
Marketing companies established in 2011
Multinational companies based in New York City
Software companies based in New York City
Mobile marketing
Mobile technology companies
2021 initial public offerings
Software companies of the United States
2011 establishments in New York City
Cloud computing providers
Companies listed on the Nasdaq